There are hundreds of bridges and bridge ruins found throughout Albania. A total of 90 have achieved the status of monument of cultural heritage. The oldest standing bridge in the country is the Kauri Bridge, located in the village of Poshnjë, it dates back to the late antiquity.

The longest spanning bridge is the Shushica Bridge (520 m), it crosses the Devoll river as a segment of the Banjë-Gramsh road. They are part of the important Arbër Road project which aims to connect the central region of the country with the western border of North Macedonia in a much shorter period than the old route.

Historical and architectural interest bridges 
Only 72 bridges built during the Ottoman period have survived.

Major road and railway bridges

Alphabetical list

Notes and references 
 

 Others references

See also 

 Transport in Albania
 Highways in Albania
 Motorways in Albania
 Rail transport in Albania
 Geography of Albania
 List of rivers of Albania

External links 

 
 
 

Albania
 
Bridges
Bridges